Le Stand de Tir de Versailles is a firing range located in Versailles, France in the Le Parc des Sports de Versailles. For the 1924 Summer Olympics in neighboring Paris, it hosted all of the sport shooting events except trap shooting which took place at Issy-les-Moulineaux, and the shooting portion of the modern pentathlon.

Notes

References
1924 Olympics official report. pp. 489, 548.

Venues of the 1924 Summer Olympics
Olympic modern pentathlon venues
Olympic shooting venues
Shooting ranges in France
Sports venues in Yvelines